Warren D. Chisum (born July 4, 1938) is an American politician who served in the Texas House of Representatives from 1989 to 2013.

Legislative career 
Chisum started his political career as a Democrat, but he party switched to the Republican Party on June 26, 1995 during the 74th Texas leglislature.

Personal life 
Chisum was born in Miami, Texas and was raised in Pampa. He graduated from Lefors High School in 1957. He has two children with his wife Omega and is a Baptist.

References

1938 births
Living people
Democratic Party members of the Texas House of Representatives
Republican Party members of the Texas House of Representatives